Statistics of Austrian Staatsliga A in the 1949–50 season.

Overview
It was contested by 13 teams, and FK Austria Wien won the championship.

League standings

Results

References
Austria - List of final tables (RSSSF)

Austrian Football Bundesliga seasons
Austria
1949–50 in Austrian football